The Butterfly Effect is 1995 Spanish-French romantic comedy film directed by Fernando Colomo which stars María Barranco, Coque Malla, and Rosa Maria Sardà, with James Fleet, Peter Sullivan, and Cécile Pallas in supporting roles. It features dialogue in Spanish and English. Ketama was responsible for the score.

Cast

See also 
 List of Spanish films of 1995

References

External links

1995 romantic comedy films
Spanish romantic comedy films
Films directed by Fernando Colomo
1995 films
1990s Spanish films
1990s French films
1990s Spanish-language films
1990s English-language films
Spanish-language French films